Committee on Small Business or Small Business Committee can refer to:

 United States House Committee on Small Business
United States House Small Business Subcommittee on Health and Technology
United States House Small Business Subcommittee on Agriculture, Energy and Trade
United States House Small Business Subcommittee on Contracting and Workforce
United States House Small Business Subcommittee on Investigations, Oversight and Regulations
United States House Small Business Subcommittee on Economic Growth, Tax and Capital Access
 United States Senate Committee on Small Business and Entrepreneurship